Terry Rooney is an American baseball coach and former pitcher, who is the current recruiting coordinator for the Purdue Boilermakers. He played college baseball at Davis & Elkins College in 1993, transferring to Radford where he played from 1994 to 1996. Rooney then served as the head coach of the UCF Knights (2009–2016) and the interim head coach of the Alabama Crimson Tide (2017).

Head coaching career
In 2009, Rooney replaced longtime UCF Knights head coach, Jay Bergman. On June 21, 2010, Rooney signed a four-year contract extension with the university, making him the Knights head baseball coach through 2014. In 2011, Rooney led the Knights to a 39–23 (12–12) season and their first NCAA Tournament appearance under his leadership.  UCF reached the tournament again in 2012. In 2014, the Knights' first year in the American Athletic Conference, Rooney was named conference Coach of the Year. Rooney left following the 2016 season after compiling a record of 261–210 at UCF.

Assistant coaching career
From 1997–2003, Rooney was an assistant coach at
George Washington, James Madison, Old Dominion and Stetson. In 1997, he was pitching coach of the Cotuit Kettleers, a collegiate summer baseball team in the Cape Cod League. In 2004, Rooney joined the staff at Notre Dame under head coach Paul Mainieri. In 2007, he followed Mainieri to LSU before leaving in 2009 to become the head coach of the UCF Knights. In 2017 following his tenure at UCF, he was the associate head coach/interim head coach at Alabama.

Head coaching record

See also
List of current NCAA Division I baseball coaches

External links
Official Bio at UCFKnights.com
Official Bio @ LSUSports.net

References

Living people
1973 births
Davis & Elkins Senators baseball players
Baseball coaches from Virginia
George Washington Colonials baseball coaches
James Madison Dukes baseball coaches
Houston Cougars baseball coaches
LSU Tigers baseball coaches
Notre Dame Fighting Irish baseball coaches
Old Dominion Monarchs baseball coaches
Sportspeople from Fairfax County, Virginia
Radford Highlanders baseball players
Stetson Hatters baseball coaches
UCF Knights baseball coaches
Alabama Crimson Tide baseball coaches
Purdue Boilermakers baseball coaches
Cape Cod Baseball League coaches